Uropyia meticulodina is a species of moth of the family Notodontidae first described by Oberthür in 1884. It is found in Taiwan, Japan and the Chinese provinces of Yunnan, Hubei and Shaanxi.

The wingspan is 45–55 mm. Adults are dead leaf mimics.

References

Moths described in 1884
Notodontidae
Moths of Japan